Demirköy ("iron village"; known as Малък Самоков, Malak Samokov in Bulgarian) is a town and district of Kırklareli Province, İğneada, in the Marmara region of Turkey. According to the Ottoman population statistics of 1914, the kaza of Demirköy had a total population of 9.133, consisting of 5.110 Greeks and 4.023 Muslims. The inhabitants are mainly descendants of Muslims from the village of Tisovo and other villages from the Greek side of the Chech region who were settled in Demirköy during the population exchange between Greece and Turkey in 1923/1924. Prior to that, the village was known as Samakovo or Samokov.

The mayor is Muhlis Yavuz (MHP). In 2020, the population of the town was 3.400 and the district 8.829.

Visitor attractions

The Lake Saka Nature Reserve is situated inside the national park.

References

Populated places in Kırklareli Province
Districts of Kırklareli Province
Pomak communities in Turkey